California Cars may refer to:
California car (streetcar), a type of tram popularized in California
California Car (railcar), coaches owned by Caltrans for operation by Amtrak
CalCars, a non-profit organization promoting plug-in hybrid electric vehicles